Let The Season In was recorded during the Mormon Tabernacle Choir's 2013 Christmas shows in the LDS Conference Center, with special guests operatic soprano  Deborah Voigt and actor John Rhys-Davies.  An album and concert DVD were released on October 14, 2014, along with a companion book titled God Bless Us, Every One!: The Story Behind A Christmas Carol. The recorded concert will be broadcast on PBS premiering December 19, 2014.

Track listing

Charts

References

Tabernacle Choir albums
2014 Christmas albums
Christmas albums by American artists